The Deutsches St. Leger is a Group 3 flat horse race in Germany open to thoroughbreds aged three years or older. It is run at Dortmund over a distance of 2,800 metres (about 1¾ miles), and it is scheduled to take place each year in September or October.

It is Germany's equivalent of the St. Leger Stakes, a famous race in England.

History
The event was established in 1881, and it was originally restricted to three-year-olds. It was staged at Hanover until 1908, and for a period it was called the Norddeutsches Saint Leger. It was transferred to Grunewald in 1909, and to Hoppegarten in 1934.

The race became known as the Lehndorff-Rennen in 1940. It was cancelled in 1945 and 1946, and held at Dortmund in 1947. It took place at Düsseldorf in 1948 and 1949, and on the latter occasion it was renamed the Deutsches St. Leger. It began its current spell at Dortmund in 1950.

The present system of race grading was introduced in Germany in 1972, and the Deutsches St. Leger was initially given Group 2 status. The first winner to complete a Triple Crown (having previously won the Henckel-Rennen and the Deutsches Derby) was Königsstuhl in 1979.

The Deutsches St. Leger was relegated to Group 3 level in 2005, and opened to older horses in 2007.

Records
Most successful horse (2 wins):
 El Tango – 2005, 2007

Leading jockey (6 wins):
 Charles Ballantine – Pumpernickel (1887), Glöcknerin (1890), Wahlstatt (1893), Waschfrau (1895), Vollmond (1898), Rachenputzer (1900)
 Otto Schmidt – Ossian (1921), Ganelon (1923), Lampos (1926), Eisenkanzler (1927), Gregor (1930), Octavianus (1939)
 Gerhard Streit – Marschall Vorwärts (1938), Samurai (1940), Yngola (1944), Masetto (1955), Baalim (1961), Marinus (1964)

Leading trainer (11 wins):
 George Arnull – Abgott (1922), Weissdorn (1925), Wolkenflug (1931), Blinzen (1934), Marschall Vorwärts (1938), Octavianus (1939), Samurai (1940), Yngola (1944), Aubergine (1949), Asterios (1950), Jonkheer (1951)

Winners since 1970

 Cassis finished first in 1985, but he was relegated to second place following a stewards' inquiry.

Earlier winners

 1881: Blue Monkey
 1882: Marie
 1883: Maria
 1884: Vinea
 1885: Picollos
 1886: Antagonist
 1887: Pumpernickel
 1888: Padischah
 1889: Battenberg
 1890: Glöcknerin
 1891: Martigny
 1892: Dorn
 1893: Wahlstatt
 1894: Hannibal
 1895: Waschfrau
 1896: Dahlmann
 1897: Geranium
 1898: Vollmond
 1899: Namouna
 1900: Rachenputzer
 1901: Tuki
 1902: Hamilkar
 1903: Laurin
 1904: Real Scotch
 1905: Zenith
 1906: Hammurabi
 1907: Hildegard
 1908: Horizont
 1909: Fervor / Glockenspiel *
 1910: Cola Rienzi
 1911: Royal Flower
 1912: Royal Blue
 1913: Orchidee
 1914–15: no race
 1916: Adresse
 1917: Aversion
 1918: Prunus
 1919: Abschluss
 1920: Herold
 1921: Ossian
 1922: Abgott
 1923: Ganelon
 1924: Hornbori
 1925: Weissdorn
 1926: Lampos
 1927: Eisenkanzler
 1928: Lupus
 1929: Graf Isolani
 1930: Gregor
 1931: Wolkenflug
 1932: Mio d'Arezzo
 1933: Arjaman
 1934: Blinzen
 1935: Ricardo
 1936: Wahnfried
 1937: Abendfrieden
 1938: Marschall Vorwärts
 1939: Octavianus
 1940: Samurai
 1941: Alejana
 1942: Gradivo
 1943: Aufbruch
 1944: Yngola
 1945–46: no race
 1947: Aikern
 1948: Angeber
 1949: Aubergine
 1950: Asterios
 1951: Jonkheer
 1952: Tasman
 1953: Naras
 1954: Nardus
 1955: Masetto
 1956: Bernardus
 1957: Adios
 1958: Agio
 1959: Ordinate
 1960: Wicht
 1961: Baalim
 1962: Sudan
 1963: Nobel
 1964: Marinus
 1965: Waidwerk
 1966: Bandit
 1967: Luciano
 1968: Ballyboy
 1969: Basalt

* The 1909 race was a dead-heat and has joint winners.

See also
 List of German flat horse races

References
 Racing Post / siegerlisten.com:
 1983, 1984, 1985, 1986, 1987, 
 galopp-sieger.de – Deutsches St. Leger.
 horseracingintfed.com – International Federation of Horseracing Authorities – Deutsches St. Leger (2014).
 pedigreequery.com – Deutsches St. Leger – Dortmund.

Open long distance horse races
Horse races in Germany
Recurring sporting events established in 1881
Sport in Dortmund
1881 establishments in Germany